The SEAT Ateca is a compact crossover SUV (C-segment) manufactured by Spanish automaker SEAT. The brand's first SUV offering, the Ateca is built on the Volkswagen Group MQB A1 platform and sits in the C-SUV segment, between the Arona and Tarraco within SEAT's crossover SUV lineup. It was unveiled as a production vehicle on 1 March 2016 in Barcelona.

Overview 
The Ateca was previewed as a concept vehicle, the SEAT IBX which was showcased at the 2011 Geneva Motor Show, followed by the SEAT 20V20 Concept at the 2015 Geneva Motor Show. The production version was released in March 2016 and it went on sale from September 2016. In keeping with SEAT's tradition of naming its cars after Spanish places, The Ateca is named after Ateca village to the west of Zaragoza, near SEAT headquarters in Barcelona.

As part of Volkswagen Group policy of making similar models with shared platforms in the same factory, the Ateca is not produced in Spain, rather it is produced at Škoda production facility in Kvasiny, Czech Republic alongside the Škoda Karoq to cut costs.

The top of the range model is the Xcellence. This model boasts leather seats, an eight inch touchscreen, 18-inch alloy wheels and a drive setting wheel, which lets you choose from sport, normal, eco, individual, off-road and snow. Mid-range is the SE version, and the bottom of the range is the S version.

Facelift 
The facelifted Ateca was revealed in June 2020. Exterior revisions over the previous Ateca model include a redesigned bumpers, revised radiator grille, new LED headlamps and tail lights and a pair of redesigned fog lamps. The rear lighting units share a similar design to the Tarraco and feature sequential indicators on the FR and Xperience trim-levels. The Ateca’s block-capital badge design has been swapped for the same hand-written script found on the rear of the new Leon.

In the interior, the facelifted Ateca gets a new leather steering wheel, updated door cards and a choice of new upholstery designs. There’s also an eight-way electrically adjustable driver’s seat, a pair of new USB-C ports, a multi-colour ambient lighting system and voice recognition. The Ateca received an 8.25-inch infotainment system as standard with a larger 9.2-inch unit as an option.

Cupra Ateca 
The Ateca is also sold under a new performance-oriented brand, Cupra, whose cars are based on existing SEAT models. As the result, the car does not bear the SEAT logo in favour of the copper-tinted badge Cupra logo. It features a redesigned front and rear bumpers, quad exhaust pipes, and gloss-black detailing on several exterior elements, including the wing mirrors, side mouldings, wheels and front grille.

The Cupra Ateca gets a 2.0-litre turbocharged petrol engine producing  and paired with a 7-speed DSG dual-clutch automatic transmission, 4Drive all-wheel drive and an adaptive suspension. The car can operate in a number of modes, including a new 'Cupra' setting that firms up the suspension and allows more engine noise through to the cabin.

As standard, every Cupra Ateca model comes equipped with 19-inch alloy wheels, black Alcantara seats, a digital instrument cluster, wireless phone charging, an eight-inch touchscreen, and dynamic chassis control. Optional kit includes a Beats audio sound system, 20-inch wheels, a panoramic roof and tow bar.

Powertrain 
The entry-level petrol engine is a 1.0-litre three-cylinder turbocharged unit producing . The other petrol engine available 1.5-litre EcoTSI motor with  shared with the VW Golf and SEAT Leon, and is able to close down cylinders to save fuel when they’re not required. Even the most potent diesel with four-wheel drive emits 131 g/km.

A 7-speed DSG transmission is available on these diesel engines.

Safety 
The Ateca was awarded 5 stars by Euro NCAP in 2016.

The Czech-made Ateca in its most basic Latin American configuration with 7 airbags received 5 stars for adult occupants, 5 stars for toddlers, and Advanced Award from Latin NCAP in 2017.

Sales and production figures

References

External links 

 Official website
 Cupra Leasing (in German)
 Ateca Specs, dimensions, fuel consumption

Ateca
Ateca
Crossover sport utility vehicles
Front-wheel-drive vehicles
All-wheel-drive vehicles
Euro NCAP small off-road
Latin NCAP small off-road
2010s cars
Cars introduced in 2016
Cars of Spain